John Lewis (1717–1783) was Dean of Ossory from 1755 to 1783.

He was educated at Westminster School  and Christ Church, Oxford, where he matriculated in 1734 and graduated B.A. in 1738. He died on 28 June 1783.

Notes

Alumni of Christ Church, Oxford
Deans of Ossory
1717 births
1783 deaths